The Milano–Vignola was a professional road bicycle race held annually in the Province of Modena, Italy. The last edition took place in 1996, becoming the Gran Premio Bruno Beghelli in 1997.

Winners

External links
Milano-Vignola by memoire-du-cyclisme.net 

Defunct cycling races in Italy
Recurring sporting events established in 1952
1952 establishments in Italy
Recurring sporting events disestablished in 1996
Men's road bicycle races
1996 disestablishments in Italy